Greg Oravetz (born August 25, 1966 in Huntington Beach, California) is a former American racing cyclist. He won the United States National Road Race Championships in 1989.

Major results

Results:
1986
 1st La Côte Picarde
1988
 1st Paris–Chauny
1989
 1st   National Road Race Championships
 1st Philly Cycling Classic
 2nd Cascade Cycling Classic
1990
 1st Overall Killington Stage Race
1st Stage 3
1991
 1st  National Criterium Championships
 1st Overall Cascade Cycling Classic
 1st Stages 8 & 13 Herald Sun Tour
1992
 1st Prologue West-Virginia Classic
 2nd First Union Grand Prix

References

External links
 
 

1966 births
Living people
American male cyclists
Sportspeople from Huntington Beach, California